Xenambyx lansbergei is a species of beetle in the family Cerambycidae, the only species in the genus Xenambyx.

References

Torneutini
Monotypic beetle genera